Nakabayashi (written: 中林) is a Japanese surname. Notable people with the surname include:

, Japanese footballer
, better known as May'n, Japanese singer

Fictional characters
, a character in the light novel series Baka and Test

Japanese-language surnames